This is a selected list of Smithsonian Folkways musical artists. The artists here were compiled from the index of the book, Worlds of Sound by Richard Carlin, and the featured artists listed on the Smithsonian Folkways website. Not all of the artists listed here recorded exclusively for the Smithsonian Folkways label.

A

B

C

D

E

F

G

H

J

K

L
{{columns-list|colwidth=18em|
La Drivers Union Por Por Group
Peter La Farge
Alladin Langa
Noor Mohmad Langa
Shumar Khan Langa
Lead Belly
Walter "Furry" Lewis
Guy Logson
Lord Invader
Los Camperos de Valles
Los Pleneros de la 21
Los Reyes de Albuquerque
Los Texmaniacs
Otto Luening (Electronic music pioneer)
June Lazare

M

N

O

P

R

S

T

U

V

W

References

Smithsonian Folkways